Stars Kill Rock is a 1993 compilation album released on the Kill Rock Stars label.

Track listing
 Tiger Trap - "Supreme Nothing"
 godheadSilo - "Nutritious Treat"
 Frumpies - "Fuck Kitty"
 Jack Acid - "Cheap Tragedies"
 Tribe 8 - "Speed Fortress"
 Versus - "Another Face"
 Slant 6 - "Nights X 9"
 Karp - "Gauze"
 Mary Lou Lord - "Camden Town Rain"
 Huggy Bear - "Carnt Kiss"
 Calamity Jane - "Come On"
 Heroin - "Hasbeen"
 Adickdid - "Hair"
 Getaway Car - "Sony Radio"
CWA- "Only Straight Girls Wear Dresses"
 Bumblescrump - "Whiteout"
 Cheesecake - "Mother's Little Helper"
 Pansy Division - "Bunnies"
 Nikki McClure - "Omnivore"

References

1993 compilation albums
Kill Rock Stars compilation albums
Alternative rock compilation albums
Record label compilation albums
Riot grrrl albums